National Technical University may refer to:

Belarusian National Technical University
Donetsk National Technical University
Ivano-Frankivsk National Technical University of Oil and Gas
Kazakh National Technical University
Kharkiv Polytechnical Institute
National Technical University in Costa Rica
National Technical University of Athens
National Technical University of Ukraine
Vietnam National Technical University